The Humane League (THL) is an international nonprofit organization that works to end the abuse of animals raised for food through institutional and individual change, including online advertising, Meatless Monday campaigns, and corporate outreach. It creates reports through The Humane League Labs, which evaluates advocacy presentation and methods and publishes them as reports. One of these reports includes a study showing how distributing leaflets at colleges affects diet change. It was founded in 2005 in Philadelphia by Nick Cooney.

In February 2016, THL was awarded a $1 million grant from the Open Philanthropy Project (a spinoff of GiveWell working in collaboration with Good Ventures) for its corporate cage-free campaign. This was followed by an additional grant of $1 million in July 2016 for international expansion of cage-free advocacy, and a $1 million grant in November 2016 for general support.

Activism

Corporate outreach 
As of February 2015, THL had been involved in at least 67 successful campaigns to convince corporations to use only non-battery cage eggs.  These victories include major corporations Costco, Grupo Bimbo, Starbucks, Compass Group, and Dunkin' Donuts.  According to the Open Philanthropy Project, "Other leading organizations in corporate campaigns have consistently reported to us that THL plays a key role in these campaigns."  In March 2015 THL won a major victory with a cage-free pledge by Sodexo.  In 2016 THL continued to secure cage-free commitments from major corporations, including Kroger, Denny's, and Restaurant Brands International (parent company of Burger King).  According to THL, cage-free commitments secured in the first quarter of 2016 will affect tens of millions of hens.

Following negotiations with THL, United Egg Producers—which represents companies that produce 95% of all eggs produced in the United States—announced it will eliminate the culling of male chicks by 2020. Chick culling refers to the routine killing of male chicks (which are useless for meat or egg-laying), usually by gassing or grinding them alive.  Under this policy, millions fewer chicks will be killed each year.

In December 2018, THL, along with 59 other major animal welfare organizations, secured a cage-free commitment with Marriott International by 2025.

Grassroots outreach 
Grassroots outreach is a major focus of THL. According to ACE, THL distributed 841,778 leaflets and reached 4,358 students through humane education in the first three quarters of 2015.  THL has a Campus Organizer program in which college students are paid a stipend to lead animal activist efforts on their college campus.

Online ads 
Outreach via online ads is another of THL's main activities. The organization reported 1,942,924 clicks on their ads in the first three quarters of 2015.

Humane League Labs 
Humane League Labs is a unit of THL founded in 2013 to conduct research on the effectiveness of different animal advocacy tactics.  As of June 2016, Humane League Labs is planning to conduct research on the degree to which farm animal advocacy motivates the purchase of vegan products and on the effectiveness of online vegan outreach.  Vegan Publishers has criticized the methodology and reporting of previous Humane League Lab studies.

Animal Charity Evaluators review 
THL has been one of Animal Charity Evaluators' (ACE) top recommended charities since ACE's inception in August 2012.

2018 review 
In their 2018 review, ACE estimated that for an average $1,000 donation, THL would spend the marginal money as follows:

$420 to corporate outreach for better welfare policies
$320 on grassroots outreach, including leafleting, corporate campaigns, and humane education
$130 on online ads
$100 on communications and social media
$30 on studies through Humane League Labs

The money is estimated to save roughly 4,300 animals and prevent 1,500 years of life on a factory farm. The bulk of these animals are chickens since THL focuses most of their corporate outreach on cage-free and broiler welfare policies.

ACE states that THL has a funding gap of $350,000 to $5.3 million and could effectively put to use $10.1 million to $13.4 million before losing any effectiveness. This funding would likely be used to expand their volunteering program and to support the corporate adoption of cage-free laying hen policies through their sister organization, the Open Wing Alliance.

2017 review 
In their 2017 review, ACE estimated that for an average $1,000 donation, THL would spend the marginal money as follows:

$490 to corporate outreach for better welfare policies
$150 on grassroots outreach, including leafleting, corporate campaigns, and humane education
$140 on online ads
$100 on communications and social media
$90 on campus outreach
$30 on studies through Humane League Labs

ACE states that THL could have used $600,000 to $3.5 million more funding in 2017 before losing any effectiveness. This funding would have likely been used for the growth of their UK office and to grow the Open Wing Alliance.

2016 review 
In their 2016 review of THL, ACE lists the organization's strengths as their strong efforts to assess and improve their own programs, its strong organizational structure and culture, and its track record of success.  ACE's review raises concerns about THL's evaluation of the cost-effectiveness of its local offices, and suggests that THL more deeply engage with "big questions" relative to effective animal advocacy such as the value of focusing individual dietary change as opposed to building the animal advocacy movement and shifting social norms in general.

ACE's 2016 review estimates that THL would allocate a $1,000 donation as follows:
$300 to corporate outreach for better welfare policies
$290 on grassroots outreach, including leafleting, corporate campaigns, and humane education
$250 on online ads
$120 on communications and social media
$40 on campus outreach

ACE states that, as of this review, THL could use $1 million to $1.5 million more in funding in 2017 above their 2016 budget.  This funding would likely be used to expand international work and their campus outreach program.

2015 review 
In their 2015 review, ACE estimated that for an average $1,000 donation, THL would spend the marginal money as follows:

 $320 on online ads, leading to 3,000 online video views.
 $450 on grassroots outreach, resulting in the distribution of about 1,319 leaflets and reaching about 7 students through humane education lectures.
 $220 campaigning for cage-free egg and Meatless Mondays policies and about $10 on research.

ACE estimated that THL could use $190,000 in funds from ACE-directed donors for the 2015 giving season.

2014 review 
In December 2014, ACE published its first detailed review of THL. According to the review: "THL's most impressive accomplishment for us is not through any one of their programs, but through their overall outlook and approach to advocacy. Among animal advocacy organizations, they make exceptionally strong efforts to assess their own programs and to look for and test out ways of improving them. Their success in applying these techniques to their online ads program, and their publication of their research through Humane League Labs, has shifted the outlook and programming of several larger advocacy organizations toward finding the best ways to advocate for animals." Conversely, ACE raised concerns about THL not valuing transparency highly enough, and justifying local offices simply based on whether they brought as much money as they spent, rather than relative to counterfactual uses of money.

ACE estimated that THL would spend a marginal $1,000 as follows:

 $540 on online ads, leading to 2,160 online video views. 
 $150 on leafleting, resulting in the distribution of about 1,667 leaflets (Vegan Outreach bears the $400 cost of printing and shipping these leaflets).
 $120 campaigning for cage-free eggs on college campuses or for Meatless Mondays in K-12 schools.
 $10 on national corporate campaigns.

ACE recommended moving $50,000 to THL but said they believed the organization was capable of absorbing up to $270,000.

Reception 
THL's online vegan advocacy ads have been discussed and critiqued on LessWrong and by negative utilitarian Brian Tomasik.

Partly as a result of the ACE recommendation, THL has been viewed positively in the effective altruism movement. Raising for Effective Giving lists THL as one of the charities it recommends giving to. The Chronicle of Philanthropy cited an example of an effective altruist who chose to pursue a career in finance so that he could pursue earning to give, donating large sums to The Humane League to help it spend more aggressively in pursuit of its goals.

THL has been listed as a top charity by ACE since August 2012, with the most updated review in November 2018.

Funding

Open Philanthropy Project 
THL was awarded a $1 million grant by the Open Philanthropy Project (abbreviated Open Phil, and a spinoff of GiveWell working in collaboration with Good Ventures) for its corporate cage-free campaign. The grant was part of a larger strategy by the Open Philanthropy Project to fund corporate cage-free campaigns, with other grant recipients including Mercy for Animals and The Humane Society of the United States.

In July 2016, Open Phil awarded another $1 million to THL for expanding international cage-free advocacy, with a focus on Latin America, Europe, and Japan. The grant was announced along with four other similar grants, totaling about $2.6 million. The other recipient organizations were Mercy for Animals, Humane Society International, Animal Equality, and People for Animals.

In November 2016, Open Phil made a $1 million grant to THL for general support. The grant was announced along with a $1 million grant for general support to Mercy for Animals.

In September 2017, Open Phil made a $2 million grant to THL for general support of the Open Wing Alliance. It was followed up by a $1.5 million grant to the same organization in March 2019.

References

External links
The Humane League

Animal rights organizations
Animal welfare organizations based in the United States
Non-profit organizations based in Pennsylvania
Organizations associated with effective altruism